Edward George "Eddie" Kullman (December 12, 1923 – March 15, 1997) was a Canadian professional ice hockey player who played 343 games in the National Hockey League, all for the New York Rangers. Kullman is related to former Hershey Bears player Arnie Kullman.

Playing career
Kullman played six seasons for the Rangers, including three seasons where he suited up for all 70 regular-season games.  He participated in one playoff series, in which the Rangers were eliminated by the Detroit Red Wings in six games.

A memorable incident in Kullman's career occurred against Maurice Richard and the Montreal Canadiens.  While Kullman was being restrained by an official, Richard took the opportunity to attack him with his stick, sending Kullman to the ice on his knees.

Career statistics

Awards and achievements
Turnbull Cup MJHL Championship (1943)
Memorial Cup Championship (1943)
Calder Cup Championship (1949)
"Honoured Member" of the Manitoba Hockey Hall of Fame

References

External links

Ed Kullman's biography at Manitoba Hockey Hall of Fame

1923 births
1997 deaths
Canadian ice hockey right wingers
New York Rangers players
Ice hockey people from Winnipeg
Winnipeg Rangers players